YTH domain containing 2 is a protein that in humans is encoded by the YTHDC2 gene.

References

Further reading